Dhimal is a Sino-Tibetan language of Nepal spoken by about 20,000 people spoken in the Terai of Koshi Province. There is an eastern and western dialect, which are separated by the Kankai River. Most people transcribe Dhimal into Devanagari and there are standard conventions for extra phonological distinctions.

Distribution and status
Dhimal is spoken in the southern Terai of eastern Nepal, specifically in the districts of Morang, Jhapa and Sunsari. In the region the Dhimal make up slightly more than 1% of the population.

The eastern and western dialects are separated by the Kankai River in Jhapa District. The main areas of concentration for the western dialect is between the towns of Belbari and Damak, while the eastern dialect is concentrated along the Mechi River bordering India.

Until the early 20th century, the Terai was considered a hostile environment for non-indigenous peoples and the Dhimal were thus left undisturbed. With the mass migration of hill people to the Terai came the destruction of most of the forest cover and thus the Dhimals were displaced and forced into a marginal position in society. The Dhimals have been thrust into a cash economy without specific skills or land, and their culture is thus rapidly eroding due to intermarriage with other groups and assimilation to the dominant Pahadi culture. Many Dhimal parents, especially in the eastern region, have stopped teaching their children Nepali making the language highly endangered, likely to go extinct in two generations without revitalization efforts. Since the return of democracy to Nepal in the 1990s, the Dhimal have joined the struggle for linguistic and cultural equality being done by other Janjatis. In 1993 the Dhimal People's Development Centre in Damak was formed to revitalize Dhimal culture and in 2001 was given some government land to build a facility. Some literature has been published in the language and many of the youth are recording and posting Dhimal songs on sites like Youtube.

Phonology

Vowels
Dhimal has 16 primary vowel phonemes, distinguished by length and nasality, and six diphthongs.

Consonants
Dhimal has 31 consonants, including a four-way distinction between voiced & voiceless, aspirated (breathy in the case of voiced) and unaspirated.

Dhimal also has other consonants that only appear in loanwords from Indo-Aryan languages. These are /ɖ/, /ɖʱ/, /ʈ/, /ʈʱ/, /cʰ/, /ɳ/, /ɽ/, and /ʂ/. Depending on age, these may also be realized as their nearest Dhimal equivalents.

Grammar

Nouns 
Dhimal nouns can have one or multiple morphemes. Many polymorphemic nouns are made up of recognizable parts. For instance human relations are often made as a compound of the words for the two people involved in the relation. For instance aba-amai means 'parents', and is composed of the words aba meaning 'father' and amai meaning 'mother', the combination indicating their combined relationship.

Gender is marked morphologically, but only with body parts of human beings and on animate nouns.  Animals may be marked for gender with distinct lexical items. Nouns are unmarked for number, except for personal pronouns. 
For personal pronouns, singular and plural are unmarked, and only the dual number is marked or distinguished.

Vocabulary
The following Dhimal (Western dialect) basic vocabulary word list is from Regmi, et al. (2014: 92-98).

dziu 'body'
puriŋ 'head'
pusuŋ 'hair'
rʰai 'face'
misjã 'eye'
nʰatoŋ 'ear'
nʰapu 'nose'
nui 'mouth'
tasiŋ 'teeth'
detoŋ 'tongue'
dudu 'breast'
hamu 'belly'
kʰur 'arm/hand'
giru 'elbow'
kʰur 'palm'
aŋguli 'finger'
kʰursiŋ 'fingernail'
kʰokoi 'leg'
dʰale 'skin'
hara 'bone'
tumsiŋ 'heart'
hiti 'blood'
soʔ 'urine'
lisi 'feces'
dera 'village'
sa 'house'
tsale 'roof'
pʰinu 'door'
misiŋ 'firewood'
pʰesar 'broom'
siləuṭo 'mortar'
lohoro 'pestle'
hətəura 'hammer'
tsəkku 'knife'
dupʰe 'axe'
diham 'rope'
sute 'thread'
bindu 'needle'
lokʰon 'cloth'
aũTʰi 'ring'
sane 'sun'
tali 'moon'
akas 'sky'
pʰuru 'star'
barsa 'rain'
tsi 'water'
dzʰora 'river'
badle 'cloud'
 'lightning'
dʰeŋgur 'rainbow'
bʰerma 'wind'
antʰui 'stone'
dama 'path'
balʰe 'sand'
me 'fire'
dʰwã 'smoke'
buʔsuri 'ash'
bʰonoi 'mud'
dʰula 'dust'
sona 'gold'
siŋ 'tree'
lʰaba 'leaf'
dzari 'root'
tsui 'thorn'
lʰe 'flower'
pʰəlpʰul 'fruit'
torse 'mango'
jumpʰi 'banana'
gom 'wheat(husked)'
dzəu 'barley'
uŋkʰu 'rice (husked)'
bilaiti 'potato'
beŋgana 'eggplant'
bədəm 'groundnut'
martsi 'chili'
juŋgʰai 'turmeric'
mantsʰar 'garlic'
taŋgo 'onion'
kobʰi 'cauliflower'
golbʰanda 'tomato'
bəndakobʰi 'cabbage'
tsuiti 'oil'
dese 'salt'
biha 'meat'
sau 'fat (of meat)'
haja 'fish'
kitsan 'chicken'
tui 'egg'
gai 'cow'
dija 'buffalo'
dudʰe 'milk'
ḍaŋ 'horns'
meṭʰoŋ 'tail'
meʔsa 'goat'
kʰija 'dog'
puhjã 'snake'
nʰojã 'monkey'
dzahã 'mosquito'
nʰamui 'ant'
makra 'spider'
mi 'name'
djaŋ 'man'
bebal 'woman'
dzamal 'child'
aba 'father'
amai 'mother'
dada 'older brother'
one 'younger brother'
bai 'older sister'
one 'younger sister'
tsan 'son'
tsamdi 'daughter'
ke 'husband'
be 'wife'
wadzan 'boy'
bedzan 'girl'
din 'day'
belahoi 'night'
rʰima 'morning'
nitima 'noon'
dilima 'evening'
andzi 'yesterday'
nani 'today'
dzumni 'tomorrow'
atʰar 'week'
maina 'month'
basar 'year'
purna 'old'
nawa 'new'
remka 'good'
maremka 'bad'
tsuŋka 'wet'
seŋka 'dry'
rʰiŋka 'long'
poṭoka 'short'
dʰaŋka 'hot'
tirka 'cold'
dahine 'right'
debre 'left'
bʰerpa 'near'
dure 'far'
barka 'big'
atuŋka 'small'
lʰika 'heavy'
homka 'light'
ruta 'above'
leta 'below'
dze:ka 'white'
da:ka 'black'
i:ka 'red'
eʔ 'one'
nʰe 'two'
sum 'three'
dja 'four'
na 'five'
tu 'six'
nʰi 'seven'
yeʔ 'eight'
kwa 'nine'
te 'ten'
egʰarə 'eleven'
barʰə 'twelve'
eʔkuri 'twenty'
eʔ sae 'one hundred'
hasu 'who'
hai 'what'
hiso 'where'
helau 'when'
hetʰe 'how many'
hidoi 'which'
idoi 'this'
odoi 'that'
ebalai 'these'
obalai 'those'
waŋ/odoŋ 'same'
bʰenaŋ 'different'
gottaŋ 'whole'
bʰoika 'broken'
atuisa 'few'
hiŋtsʰa 'many'
dzʰaraŋ 'all'
tsali 'to eat'
ciʔli 'to bite'
mʰituli 'to be hungry'
amli 'to drink'
tsi amli kiʔli 'to be thirsty'
dzimli 'to sleep'
ulṭili 'to lie'
jomli 'to sit'
pili 'to give'
oʔpali 'to burn'
sili 'to die'
seʔli 'to kill'
uraili 'to fly'
teli 'to walk'
dʰaʔli 'to run/run'
haneli 'to go/go'
loli 'to come'
nuidʰuili 'to speak/speak'
hiŋli 'to hear/hear/listen'
kʰaŋli 'to look/look'
ka 'I'
na 'you (informal)'
na 'you (formal)'
wa 'he'
wa 'she'
kelai 'we (inclusive)'
kelai 'we (exclusive)'
nelai 'you (plural)'
obalai 'they'

See also
 Dham script
Dhimalish comparative vocabulary list (Wiktionary)

References

Kiranti languages
Languages of India
Languages of Nepal
Languages of Koshi Province